The ICC Under-19 Cricket World Cup is an international cricket tournament organised by the International Cricket Council (ICC) contested by national under-19 teams. First contested in 1988, as the Youth World Cup, it was not staged again until 1998. Since then, the World Cup has been held as a biennial event, organised by the ICC. The first edition of the tournament had only eight participants, but every subsequent edition has included sixteen teams. India have won the World Cup on a record five occasions, while Australia have won three times, Pakistan twice, and Bangladesh, England, South Africa and the West Indies once each. Two other teams New Zealand and Sri Lanka have made it to tournament finals. India is the current champion after defeating England.

History

1988 (Winner: Australia)

The inaugural event was titled the McDonald's Bicentennial Youth World Cup, and was held in 1988 as part of the Australian Bicentenary celebrations. It took place in South Australia and Victoria. Teams from the seven Test-playing nations, as well as an ICC Associates XI, competed in a round-robin format. Australia lost only one match, their final round-robin game against Pakistan by which time they had qualified for the semis. They went on to beat Pakistan by five wickets in the final, thanks to an unbeaten hundred from Brett Williams. England and West Indies made up the last four, but India were the real disappointments. After opening with a good win against England, they suffered hefty defeats in four matches to be knocked out early.
The tournament was notable for the number of future international players who competed. Future England captains Nasser Hussain and Mike Atherton played, as did Indian spinner Venkatapathy Raju, New Zealand all-rounder Chris Cairns, Pakistanis Mushtaq Ahmed and Inzamam-ul-Haq, Sri Lankan Sanath Jayasuriya, and West Indians Brian Lara, Ridley Jacobs, and Jimmy Adams.
Australia's Brett Williams was the leading run-scorer, with 471 runs at an average of 52.33. Wayne Holdsworth from Australia and Mushtaq Ahmed were the leading wicket-takers, with 19 wickets at averages of 12.52 and 16.21 respectively.

1998 (Winner: England)

England were the unexpected winners of the second Under-19 World Cup in South Africa. In 1998, the event was relaunched in South Africa as a biennial tournament. The only previous tournament of its kind was held ten years earlier. In addition to the nine Test-playing nations, there were teams from Bangladesh, Kenya, Scotland, Ireland, Denmark, Namibia and Papua New Guinea. The teams were divided into four pools, named after Gavaskar, Sobers, Cowdrey and Bradman, and the top two sides from each progressed to two Super League pools, whose winners advanced to the final. In order to give everyone a decent amount of cricket, the non-qualifiers competed in a Plate League, won by Bangladesh, who beat West Indies in the final. West Indies failed to qualify for the Super League after a fiasco concerning the composition of their squad – they arrived with seven players who contravened the age restrictions for the tournament. The Super League, in which every game was covered live on South African satellite television, also threw up a number of shocks and tense finishes; both pools came down to net run-rate at the finish. England, from being down and almost out, beat Pakistan – who surprisingly lost all three of their games – but lost a rain-affected match to India. Australia had beaten India and Pakistan and were favourites to reach the final. Only a massive defeat by England could deny them: but that is precisely what they suffered. In front of a crowd of about 6,000 at Newlands, they were bowled out for 147. New Zealand joined England in the final, where a century from England's Stephen Peters won the day.
Chris Gayle was the tournament's leading run-scorer, with 364 runs at an average of 72.80. West Indian Ramnaresh Sarwan and Zimbabwean Mluleki Nkala were the leading wicket-takers, with 16 wickets at 10.81 and 13.06 respectively.

2000 (Winner: India)

The 2000 tournament was held in Sri Lanka, and replicated the format from 1998. Participating nations included the nine Test-playing nations, as well as Bangladesh, Kenya, Ireland, Namibia, Holland, Nepal and a combined team from the Americas development region. To the disappointment of a large crowd at Colombo's SSC, Sri Lanka fell at the final hurdle in a final dominated by India. The winners remained unbeaten throughout, and destroyed Australia by 170 runs in the semi-final to underline their supremacy. In the other semi-final, Sri Lanka delighted a crowd of 5000 at Galle by beating Pakistan. The fact that three of the four semi-finalists were from Asia and so more attuned to the conditions was coincidental – they played the better cricket and, in Pakistan's case, had a very experienced squad. England, the defending champions, were most disappointing, and they won only one match against a Test-playing country, and that a last-ball victory over Zimbabwe. South Africa, one of the favourites, were desperately unlucky to be eliminated after three no-results gave them three points while Nepal, with four points courtesy of one win over Kenya, went through to the Super League instead. The format of the tournament was as in 1997–98, with four groups of four and then a Super League and final. Graeme Smith was the tournament's leading run-scorer, with 348 runs at an average of 87.00. Pakistan's Zahid Saeed was the leading wicket-taker, with 15 wickets at 7.60. India's Yuvraj Singh was named Man of the Series. India clinched the title for the first time under the captaincy of Mohammed Kaif.

2002 (Winner: Australia)

The fourth Under-19 World Cup held in New Zealand only confirmed Australia's dominance of the game, and from their opening match, when they obliterated Kenya by 430 runs, through to their comprehensive victory over South Africa in the final, they were never threatened. Participating nations included the ten Test-playing nations, plus Canada, Kenya, Namibia, Nepal, Papua New Guinea, and Scotland. Their captain, Cameron White, was singled out for praise for his leadership, and he chipped in with 423 runs at 70.50. And they didn't rely on pace either, playing only two seamers and four slow bowlers, with Xavier Doherty, a slow left-armer, leading the wicket-takers with 16 at 9.50 and all without a single wide. In contrast, India, the holders, underperformed in their semi-final against South Africa, a team they had easily beaten a week or so earlier. They also suffered embarrassing defeats to neighbours Pakistan and Bangladesh. Pakistan, however, provided the main upset when they lost to Nepal by 30 runs, and Nepal also gave England a few uneasy moments. Zimbabwe won the plate competition, with their expected opponents, Bangladesh, beaten in the semi-final by Nepal. Australian Cameron White was the tournament's leading run-scorer, with 423 runs at an average of 70.50 and Xavier Doherty was the leading wicket-taker, with 16 wickets at 9.50. Tatenda Taibu, Zimbabwe's captain, was Man of the Series for his 250 runs and 12 wickets, not to mention his wicket-keeping in between bowling stints.

2004 (Winner: Pakistan)

The 2004 tournament was held in Bangladesh. More than 350,000 spectators saw the 54 matches played in the tournament. The finale ended with a close final between the two best teams – West Indies and Pakistan. It was won by Pakistan by 25 runs against West Indies and a 30,000 crowd acclaimed the victorious Pakistanis almost as their own. The shock was the elimination from the main competition of holders Australia, bowled out for 73 and beaten by Zimbabwe in the group stage when Tinashe Panyangara took 6 for 31, the second-best figures in the competition's history. And Australia then lost to Bangladesh in the plate final amid thumping drums and gleeful celebrations. The downside was the quality of the cricket, which was often mediocre on some indifferent pitches, and the reporting of six unidentified bowlers for having suspect actions. Pakistan would have finished unbeaten but for a hiccup against England – when both teams had already qualified for the semis. England reached the last four, which was progress, and Alastair Cook looked a class apart. But they came unstuck against West Indies' spinners in the semi-final. India completed the semi-finalists. Shikhar Dhawan and Suresh Raina were the backbone of a strong batting line-up, and Raina's 90 from just 38 balls against the hapless Scots was as brutal an innings as one will see at any level. Both looked international-class already, though faced with a tough task breaking into their senior side's formidable top order. The captain Ambati Rayudu had been hailed as the next great batting hope, having scored a century and a double in a first-class match at the age of 17. But he did not score the runs promised and was banned by the referee John Morrison from the semi-final after allowing a funereal over-rate during the Super League win against Sri Lanka: eight overs were bowled in the first 50 minutes. India's Shikhar Dhawan was named Man of the Tournament, and was the tournament's leading run-scorer, with 505 runs at an average of 84.16. Bangladeshi Enamul Haque was the leading wicket-taker, with 22 wickets at 10.18.

2006 (Winner: Pakistan)

This tournament was always going to struggle to live up to the overwhelming response that greeted the previous event in Bangladesh. Despite free tickets the matches were sparsely attended even when the home side were in action, but it shouldn't detract from an impressive two weeks which finished with Pakistan securing their second consecutive title in an extraordinary final against India at the Premadasa Stadium. Pakistan crumbled to 109, but in a thrilling passage of play reduced India to 9 for 6. Nasir Jamshed, and Anwar Ali, two of the success stories of the tournament, did the damage and there was no way back for India who fell 38 runs short. These two teams and Australia were the pick of the sides and along with England – who surpassed expectation to reach the semi-finals after beating a talented Bangladesh side – made up the final four. A number of players caught the eye, notably Australia captain Moises Henriques, the Indian batsmen Cheteshwar Pujara – the tournament's leading run-scorer – and teammate Rohit Sharma, along with legspinner Piyush Chawla, who a few weeks later made his Test debut against England. However, perhaps the best story of the tournament was Nepal claiming the Plate trophy after a thrilling victory against New Zealand having also beaten South Africa during the event

2008 (Winner: India)

It was the first time the tournament was held in an Associate Member country. The 2008 Under-19 Cricket World Cup was held in Malaysia from 17 February to 2 March 2008. Along with hosts, 15 other teams battled in 44 matches packed into 15 days across three cities. India, still smarting from the loss in the previous edition had reason to be upbeat with Tanmay Srivastava, a mature batsman who eventually finished as the tournament's leading run-getter, in their ranks. Australia and England had forgettable campaigns, coming up short against the big teams after making mincemeat of the minnows. Defending champions Pakistan were fortuitous to reach the semi-finals as their batsmen never really got going and, against South Africa in the semi-finals, Pakistan had to chase 261. New Zealand, boosted by Man of the Tournament Tim Southee, were impressive before losing to India in a narrow run-chase under lights and cloudy skies in the other semi-final. South Africa's captain Wayne Parnell had played a major role in ensuring their passage to the summit clash, picking up the most wickets in the tournament en route. But they had lost to India in the group stages and lightning did strike twice. India under the leadership of Virat Kohli, after being bowled out for 159, emerged triumphant by 12 runs under the D/L method and were crowned champions for the second time.

2010 (Winner: Australia)

The 2010 Under-19 Cricket World Cup was held in New Zealand in January 2010.  The tournament was hosted in New Zealand after the ICC took it away from Kenya on the flimsiest of reasons which ridiculed its own to spread the game. Kenya were further kicked by the ICC as their side was not allowed to participate as it had not won the African qualifying event – a weakened side had been fielded as at the time, as hosts, they did not need to qualify. As it was, New Zealand did a decent job but crowds were dismal and the group stages were as tediously predictable as in the senior tournament, with the better-funded big nations dominating. South Africa did beat Australia in a good match but a dead rubber. The competition came alive in the quarter-finals as West Indies beat England and Sri Lanka defeated South Africa. The best tie of the competition came when Pakistan beat fierce rivals India by two wickets with three balls remaining in a low-scoring match. The final between Australia and Pakistan was a rematch of the first tournament, and Australia won by 25 runs in a game where fortunes ebbed and flowed throughout.

2012 (Winner: India)

The 2012 Under-19 Cricket World Cup was held in the Tony Ireland Stadium, Australia. Along with the ten test playing nations, Afghanistan, Nepal, Papua New Guinea, Ireland, Scotland and Namibia also participated in this tournament. Australia lost against India in the final on 26 August 2012. India's third U19 World Cup meant they tied for the most wins with Australia. Sri Lanka could not go through into the last eight but won the Plate championship by defeating Afghanistan by 7 wickets. Reece Topley of England was the highest wicket taker whereas Anamul Haque of Bangladesh was the top run getter. India won the final against Australia with 14 balls to spare and 6 wickets remaining. Captain Unmukt Chand played a match winning knock of 111* not out in 130 balls with the help of 6 sixes & 7 fours. Sandeep Sharma also excelled with four wickets under his belt.

2014 (Winner: South Africa)
 
The 2014 Under-19 Cricket World-Cup was held in Dubai (U.A.E.) in 2014. It was the first time that U.A.E. had hosted an ICC event. Afghanistan was the only non-full member to qualify for the Quarter Finals. This was the first time that Afghanistan reached the last eight of this tournament, courtesy of their stellar performance against Australia in the group stage. In fact, this was the second time that a non-test playing nation qualified for the Super League/Quarter Finals, Nepal being the first one in the 2000 edition.
India wobbled in the Quarter Finals against England and finally lost in the final over. This was the first semi-final berth for England in the last four editions. Pakistan beat England in the semis to reach its fifth Under-19 Final, becoming the first team to do so. South Africa beat Australia in the second semi-final. In a one-sided final, South Africa beat Pakistan and claimed its maiden U-19 World Cup title. Corbin Bosch, son of former South African cricketer late Tertius Bosch, was the Man of the Match in the finals and Aiden Markram was the Man of the Series. South Africa did not lose even a single match in the entire tournament.

2016 (Winner: West Indies)

The 2016 Under-19 Cricket World Cup was held in Bangladesh. It was the eleventh edition of the Under-19 World Cup, and the second to be held in Bangladesh. On 5 January 2016, Australia announced that the Australian squad had pulled out of the tournament, citing security reasons. Defending champions South Africa were knocked out of the tournament in the group stage, with back-to-back defeats to Bangladesh and Namibia. This was the first time that two non-test playing nations – Nepal and Namibia – qualified for the Super League/Quarterfinals. The West Indies defeated India by five wickets in the final, claiming their first title. Bangladesh's captain Mehedi Hasan was named player of the tournament, while England's Jack Burnham and Namibia's Fritz Coetzee led the tournament in runs and wickets, respectively.

2018 (Winner: India)

The 2018 Under-19 Cricket World Cup was held in New Zealand. India and Australia played in the finals at Mount Maunganui on 3 Feb 2018. It was the 12th Edition of the Under-19 World Cup. India defeated Australia by 8 wickets, with Manjot Kalra scoring a match-winning 101* under the captaincy of Prithvi Shaw . The Man of the match was awarded to Manjot Kalra, while player of the tournament was awarded to Shubman Gill. India now holds the most wins record in Under-19 World Cup.
Rahul Dravid is the head coach of this India Under-19 Team. later he appointed has India national cricket team head coach on nov 2021

2020 (Winner: Bangladesh)

The 2020 Under-19 Cricket World Cup was held in South Africa. The thirteenth edition of the Under-19 World Cup, and the second to be held in South Africa. The final was played between India and Bangladesh which Bangladesh won after defeating India by 3 wickets in the final match at Potchefstroom, South Africa, based on Duckworth Lewis Method on 9 Feb 2020. This was Bangladesh's first ICC Under-19 World Cup victory.

In the final, India, batting first gathered 177 runs before being all out. In reply, Bangladesh made a flying start as they scored 55 runs losing only a wicket in first 10 overs. Soon Indian leggie Ravi Bishnoi picked up four quick wickets as Bangladesh were 102 for 6 from 62/2 at the end of 25 overs. When Bangladesh were 163/7 at the end of 41 overs and the still needing 15 runs to win, rain arrives and the match was reduced to 46 overs with a revised target as per DLS method was seven runs needing from 30 balls. From thereon, Bangladesh did not take any unnecessary risks and scored the winning run with 23 balls to spare thanks to the innings of captain Akbar Ali and won their first ICC title by three wickets.

Top performers of the tournament were both Indians in batting or bowling. Yashasvi Jaiswal scored 400 runs throughout the tournament while Ravi Bishnoi took 17 wickets.

2022 (Winner: India)

The 2022 Under-19 Cricket World Cup was held in the West Indies. The fourteenth edition of the Under-19 World Cup, and the first to be held in Caribbean. The final was played between India and England which India won after defeating England by 4 wickets in the final match at North Sound, Antigua. This was India's fifth ICC Under-19 World Cup victory, the maximum by any country.

In the final, England, batting first gathered 189 runs before being all out. In reply, India attained the required target in 47.4 overs, after losing 6 wickets.
Yash Dhull walks up to collect the Under 19 World Cup trophy from Sir Richie Richardson to become the fifth Indian captain to win the title after Mohammad Kaif, Virat Kohli, Unmukt Chand and Prithvi Shaw.
Dewald Brevis of South Africa scored the maximum runs (506) in the tournament and was named the player of the series. Dunith Wellalage of Sri Lanka had highest wickets of his name with 17 wickets.

Results

Plate League

Summary of all teams in all tournaments
In the table below, teams are sorted by best performance, then winning percentage, then (if equal) by alphabetical order.

Note: the win percentage excludes no results and counts ties as half a win.

Team result by tournament

Debut of teams
Team appearing for the first time, in alphabetical order per year.

Records

Team records

Highest innings totals

Lowest innings totals

Most consecutive wins
Most consecutive wins
 11 –  2018–2020
 9 –  2002–2004;  2020-2022
 8 –  2000–2002, 2008–2010, 2012–2014;  2004–2006;  2006–2008;  2010–2012

Most consecutive losses
Most consecutive losses
 21 – , 1998–2008
 18 – , 2012–2022
 11 – , 2008–2014
 10 – , 2002–2004
 9 – , 2004–2012

Individual records
Most appearances
 20 –  Kanishka Chaugai, 2002–2006
 19 –  Stephan Swanepoel, 1998–2002;  Greg Thompson, 2004–2008
 18 –  Moneeb Iqbal, 2002–2006;  Hashmatullah Shahidi, 2010–2014;  Wesley Madhevere, 2016–2020

Most career runs

Most runs in a single tournament
 506 –  Dewald Brevis, 2022
 505 –  Shikhar Dhawan, 2004
 471 –  Brett Williams, 1988
 423 –  Cameron White, 2002
 421 –  Donovan Pagon, 2002

Highest individual scores

Highest partnerships (by wicket)

Most career wickets
Source:
 28 –  Wesley Madhevere, 2016–2020
 27 –  Moises Henriques, 2004–2006;  Greg Thompson, 2004–2008
 26 –  Abhishek Sharma, 2002–2004
 25 –  Tim Bresnan, 2002–2004

Most wickets in a single tournament
Source:
 22 –  Enamul Haque, 2004
 19 –  Wayne Holdsworth, 1988;  Mushtaq Ahmed, 1988;  Riaz Afridi, 2004;  Reece Topley, 2012
 18 –  Tariq Mahmood, 2004;  Wayne Parnell, 2008

Best bowling figures
Source:

Age records
Oldest players
Note: age restrictions were relaxed for some teams at the early editions of the tournament.

By tournament

Notes

References

External links
 ICC U-19 CWC (official site)
 ICC U-19 CWC (ICC U-19 2012 Winning Team)

 
Under-19
Under-19 cricket
Under-19
Recurring sporting events established in 1988